Mathias Uhlén (born May 1954) is a Swedish biologist, biotechnologist, and Professor of Microbiology at Royal Institute of Technology (KTH), Stockholm. His research interests cover antibody engineering, proteomics and precision medicine.

Life
In 1984 Uhlén received his PhD at the Royal Institute of Technology (KTH) in Stockholm.  After being employed at the European Molecular Biology Laboratory in Heidelberg, Germany, he became professor at KTH in 1988. His research has led to more than 750 publications, 80,000 citations.

In 2003, as  part of an international project to map the complete human proteome and transcriptome system, the Human Protein Atlas project was created and launched. Uhlén is Program Director of the project. There are six additional projects within the primary project.
 The Tissue Atlas is a Swedish project to provide expression profiles of human genes both on the mRNA and protein level, within the body.
 The Cell Atlas provides high-resolution insights into the spatial distribution of proteins within cells.
 The Pathology Atlas showing how cancer patient survival is tied to RNA and protein levels. The project contains mRNA and protein expression data for the most common forms of human cancer.
 The Blood Atlas showing the expression of proteins in human immune cells and also mapping the proteins in human blood
 The Brain Atlas showing the proteins expressed in the different parts of human, pig and mouse brains.
 The Single Cell Type Atlas shows single cell RNA sequencing (scRNAseq) data from 13 different human tissues, together with immunohistochemically stained tissue sections visualizing the corresponding spatial protein expression patterns.

Awards and honours

He is member of the

 National Academy of Engineering (NAE) in USA, the Royal Swedish Academy of Science (KVA).  
 Royal Academy of Engineering Sciences (IVA)
 European Molecular Biology Organization (EMBO).

He is the President of the European Federation of Biotechnology. From 2010 to 2015, he was the founding Director of the Science for Life Laboratory (SciLifeLab) which is a national center for molecular bioscience.

References

External links
 

1954 births
Living people
Swedish microbiologists
KTH Royal Institute of Technology alumni
Academic staff of the KTH Royal Institute of Technology